Francisco Campos Salamanca (8 March 1916 – 8 September 1995) was a Spanish footballer who played as a forward. With 127 goals, 120 of which were for Atlético Madrid, he is the highest scoring player from the Canary Islands in La Liga.

Club career
Born in Las Palmas, Canary Islands, he began his career in 1934 with Marino F.C., one of the clubs which fused to create UD Las Palmas.

After the Spanish Civil War, he moved to Atlético Aviación (now Atlético Madrid), with whom he debuted on 7 January 1940 in a Madrid derby against Real Madrid. His first goals were a brace on 4 February in a 4–1 win against Celta de Vigo, and on 8 March he scored a hat-trick against Real Zaragoza as Atlético won 5–1. He finished his first season with 8 goals from 17 appearances, and Atlético won the league.

Atlético retained the league the following season, and Campos scored 16 in 24 games. His most prolific season was 1941–42, with 20 goals in 25 games. In the late 1940s, he was part of the Delantera de la Seda frontline with José Juncosa, Alfonso Silva, Antonio Vidal Caturla and Adrián Escudero.

He scored 12 goals in Madrid derbies, the most by an Atlético player. (nine in the league, and another three in the cup).

After nine seasons at Atlético, he joined Sporting de Gijón who had just been relegated to the Segunda División. He was their player-manager for the second half of the 1949–50 season, and the following season was part of their team which gained promotion. He scored 7 goals in 11 games on their return to La Liga in 1951–52 and then retired.

International career
Campos made his debut on 12 January 1941 in a 2–2 friendly draw with Portugal in Lisbon. He followed this game with five goals in his next four internationals, including a brace in a 4–0 win against France at the Estadio de Nervión in Seville on 15 March 1942, eventually finishing with 5 goals from 6 internationals.

International goals
Scores and results list Spain's goal tally first.

Managerial career
In his native Canary Islands, Campos managed UD Las Palmas in the 1961–62 Segunda División and CD Tenerife in the same league in 1963–64.

Honours
Atlético Madrid
La Liga: 1939–40, 1940–41
Copa de Campeones: 1940
Real Gijón
Segunda División: 1950–51

References

1916 births
1995 deaths
Footballers from Las Palmas
Association football forwards
Spanish footballers
Spain international footballers
Atlético Madrid footballers
Sporting de Gijón players
La Liga players
Segunda División players
Spanish football managers
Sporting de Gijón managers
CD Badajoz managers
UD Salamanca managers
UD Las Palmas managers
CD Tenerife managers